Carboxypeptidase N catalytic chain is an enzyme that in humans is encoded by the CPN1 gene.

Carboxypeptidase N is a plasma metallo-protease that cleaves basic amino acids from the C terminal of peptides and proteins. The enzyme is important in the regulation of peptides like kinins and anaphylatoxins, and has also been known as kininase-1 and anaphylatoxin inactivator. This enzyme is a tetramer composed of two identical regulatory subunits and two identical catalytic subunits; this gene encodes the catalytic subunit. Mutations in this gene can be associated with angioedema or chronic urticaria resulting from carboxypeptidase N deficiency.

In melanocytic cells CPN1 gene expression may be regulated by MITF.

References

External links

Further reading